The Drew Barrymore Show (often shortened to Drew) is a first-run syndicated American talk show hosted by actress Drew Barrymore. The show is distributed by CBS Media Ventures and debuted on September 14, 2020. In April 2022, the show was renewed for a third season. In January 2023, the show was renewed for a fourth season.

Concept
The program features human-interest stories, celebrity guests, lifestyle segments and field pieces.

Production
Barrymore shot a pilot for the show in New York City in August 2019, aiming for a fall 2020 launch. Barrymore had previously circled a talk show deal with Warner Bros.' Telepictures in 2016, but a pilot never came to fruition, in part because of a lukewarm response from prospective station groups at the time.

Barrymore debuted several digital series in the lead-up to her broadcast debut that included “The Making of the Drew Barrymore Show” and conversations with talk-show hosts who have inspired her in “The Art of the Interview.” This particular series included Barrymore's conversations with Gayle King, Andy Cohen, Jimmy Fallon, Whoopi Goldberg, and Sean Evans.

Barrymore also launched "Drew's Movie Nite", in which she would invite fans to join her in a live Twitter watch party. The series kicked off on July 30, 2020 with the Nickelodeon broadcast of the 1997 film Good Burger. Also featured in the interview were the stars of Good Burger, Kel Mitchell and Kenan Thompson.

The next edition of "Drew's Movie Nite" was the Nickelodeon broadcast of The SpongeBob Movie: Sponge Out of Water from 2015 on September 3, 2020. This time, Barrymore interviewed the voice of SpongeBob SquarePants, Tom Kenny and the voice of Patrick Star, Bill Fagerbakke. The third edition of "Drew's Movie Nite", this time aired on CBS on October 25, 2020, and was the 1996 film Scream starring Barrymore. “Drew's Movie Nite” returned on September 5, 2021 with the CBS broadcast of School of Rock.

The show launched in fall 2020 during the COVID-19 pandemic in the United States. The launch took place with a small crew at the CBS Broadcast Center in New York, with pandemic-related rules and precautions. Instead of an in-person audience, members of a virtual crowd would be beamed in via a platform called Audience From Anywhere and projected on a large display behind Barrymore. Meanwhile, guests who live on the West Coast have the option to appear via green-screen and sit across from the host.

Barrymore also fought hard to have the show be produced live at 9 a.m. Eastern Time. According to Barrymore, she thought it would be appropriate to be doing this where she could speak to the moment rather than risk being a day or two old. Barrymore added that the type of energy when the show came out could be totally unattached. Barrymore also argued against doing a home-based show amid the pandemic.

In December 2020, the show appointed Eitan Bernath as the Principal Culinary Contributor.

The show was renewed for a second season on March 17, 2021. The show also announced that come its second season, it would be produced with a full-capacity audience in attendance at the CBS Broadcast Center in New York.

CBS Media Ventures announced on April 1, 2022, that the series had been renewed for a third season. Beginning with the 2022–23 season, the show will be reformatted into two half-hour segments that can be aired either contiguously or separately. With the new format, select CBS-owned stations will air the first segment of Drew as a lead-out to new half-hour local 9:00 a.m. newscasts, with the second half of Drew airing later in the day and/or on their duopoly stations. On January 17, 2023, the show was renewed for a fourth season.

Episodes
The debut episode featured guest appearances by Barrymore's former co-stars Cameron Diaz, Lucy Liu and Adam Sandler.

The September 25, 2020 episode featured Barrymore reuniting with her ex-husband Tom Green after having not spoken to each other in over 15 years. The two reminisced on their time together and years apart, which made Barrymore cry after she realized how much time had passed. 

The October 12, 2020 episode featured Barrymore interviewing Chloe Fineman following Fineman's impersonation of Barrymore on the October 3, 2020 edition of Saturday Night Live. Barrymore said to the second-year SNL player "I’m really nervous to meet you, I’m so excited, I’m such a fan," for which Fineman responded by saying  “I’m your biggest fan, you’re gonna make me cry!" Fineman added: “I mean doing you was so exciting because you were on the cover of InStyle and the impression that I did this summer started because I really wanted that shirt. It was so cute.”

Also on October 12, Barrymore interviewed actress Jessica Alba, with whom Barrymore co-starred in the 1999 film Never Been Kissed. Besides reminiscing about their time filming Never Been Kissed, Barrymore and Alba danced together as they took on TikTok's "Ahi Challenge".

On the October 16, 2020 episode, Barrymore invited psychic Anna Raimondi to give her a reading. Raimondi said that she sensed the presence of a "judge". This revelation caused Barrymore to burst into tears, explaining that it must be David, the dead relative of her ex-husband Will Kopelman who was a judge. But according to Kopelman, that judge in question at the time of the episode's airing, was very much alive. Kopelman soon called Raimondi a “submental hack working the talk show circuit.” A representative for Barrymore later clarified, “The grandfather of Will is Frank, who was a judge and is deceased. David is…Will’s uncle, who’s alive and also a judge. That was the confusion.”

For the October 30, 2020 episode, Barrymore celebrated Halloween by dressing up as Glinda the Good Witch from The Wizard of Oz. Barrymore was joined by Ross Mathews, who was costumed as the twister that carries Dorothy from Kansas to Oz, and Ashley Park, who sang "Somewhere Over the Rainbow".

The November 6, 2020 episode featured Barrymore in the "Drew's News" segment revive her teen character from Never Been Kissed, Josie "Grossie" Geller. Sporting her satin pink prom dress, matching scrunchie and braces, Josie stepped straight out of 1988 for the bit—with no knowledge of anything that's happened since then. Josie subsequently became a recurring sketch comedy part of the series, with Barrymore interviewing the cast of Dear Evan Hansen in-character as Josie.

For the November 20, 2020 episode, Barrymore teamed with Walmart+ to present a frontline nurse named Selina and a high school teacher with their dream wedding. But the show's videos posted to YouTube were soon filled with comments alleging that the couple met when she was a 17-year-old student in his physics class. Neither the show nor the couple have responded to the allegations.

The February 22, 2021 episode coincided with Barrymore's 46th birthday. For the occasion, late-night talk show icon David Letterman taped a surprise in-person appearance. Barrymore, who famously flashed Letterman on The Late Show in 1995, said to him "I'm so grateful that you're here." Letterman joked that the "Zoomer thing" was all his idea.

During the "Drew's News" segment on the March 12, 2021 episode, a black bar covered Jennifer Lopez's cleavage when a photo of her iconic green Versace dress from the 2000 Grammy Awards was displayed. Rich Juzwiak of Jezebel said "So iconic is this dress it inspired the creation of the Google Image search. Censoring it, then, makes it seem more salacious than ever, like pointing out the inherent shamefulness of something we were all cool on as an essential piece of Americana. 'You know you’re watching a daytime show when you’ve got that going on!' Barrymore reasoned. Indeed, the standards for what’s permissible on U.S. daytime network TV are oddly strict but still, do you think anyone was going to call complaining about a 21-year-old dress that’s practically cultural wallpaper at this point?"

While playing the game "Drew or False" during the March 24, 2021 episode, Barrymore's Poison Ivy co-star Sara Gilbert made the revelation that their kiss in the 1992 erotic thriller was her "first girl kiss". Gilbert said "Now I’m not one to kiss and tell but I have to say -- look now I’m like going to blush -- Drew was the coolest person I ever met and yeah that's what happened."

The May 6, 2021 episode featured Barrymore getting a tattoo that read ‘Home is where we are' applied to her right arm by Ryan Ashley Malarkey, who was the first female winner of the Ink Master competition.

During an interview with Dylan Farrow on May 17, 2021, Barrymore when discussing with Farrow the HBO miniseries Allen v. Farrow and the sexual abuse allegations against Woody Allen, expressed regret over working with him for Everyone Says I Love You.

Broadcast
The CBS Television Stations group was on board to anchor the launch of The Drew Barrymore Show, including on KCBS-TV in Los Angeles and WCBS-TV in New York City. Overall, the show had been cleared to launch on stations representing 85% of U.S. TV households.

In Canada, Global announced on August 18, 2020, that they would pick up The Drew Barrymore Show, before September 14. In Australia, the show aired on pay TV channel Fox Arena. In New Zealand, it's streamable and watchable on TVNZ.

Reception
The premiere episode on September 14, 2020 was "a real emotional roller coaster"  according to Jezebel's Rich Juzwiak. He added "The enthusiasm was massive, the veracity was questionable, the performance was distracting. She shifted gears in the next paragraph of her monologue to reintroduce herself, remind us that she is exactly who we think she is, and suggests that she’s so much more. With the impassioned face of a celebrity raising funds on a telethon, Barrymore said emphatically that, 'I’m also someone who is learning all the time, and I’m so excited to figure out this thing called life with you!' Wait, that’s what we’re doing here? Then she started shouting that, 'We’re gonna learn! Laugh! Cry! Cook! Heal! ALL OF IT!' Well, paint that on a piece of wood and hang it in your country kitchen. 'And I’m committed to putting all aspects of life into this show every day,' she continued. It’s only an hourlong show?" Juzwiak also said that Barrymore has been a nonstop ball of energy, which can be exhausting and endearing.

Meanwhile, Variety's Daniel D'Addario said that "The best talk show hosts are made into stars by the medium. To wit: Rosie O'Donnell was a well-known comic and actor but hardly the dynamo she eventually became when she began her daily show. She reinvented the medium that had, before her, been dominated by former local news anchor Oprah Winfrey. Both these stars did not bring to bear huge amounts of persona that was already known to the audience, so they had to work to carry across an idea of themself with each episode and segment. At their best, you walked away from their shows knowing O’Donnell and Winfrey in a way you might not otherwise have, before. Drew Barrymore, a newly-minted talk show host with her Drew Barrymore Show carried in daytime by CBS stations, has less of herself to introduce, and, more crucially, less apparent desire to do so."

D'Addario added that Barrymore was hampered in her first week by her reliance on celebrity friends, saying "Barrymore’s show is squarely in her comfort zone, and as such is in the comfort zone of any celebrity; it’s so soft and unthreatening, though, as to often make us feel we know subjects and interviewer both less well when the interview is done. We hardly need a Mike Wallace-style expose on the stars Barrymore books; that’d be weird in daytime, and it’s not what viewers look to Barrymore for. But — speaking as a Barrymore fan who was excited to see her in conversation — there is as yet untapped potential for her to dig deeper, to show us more of what she really believes or finds important."

William Hughes of The A.V. Club said that there have been two major takeaways from The Drew Barrymore Show after one week: "Drew Barrymore definitely has a lot of cool, famous friends, and Drew Barrymore sometimes acts in ways that are tremendously weird when asked to talk into a camera by herself. The combination has formed some of the most hypnotically, authentically strange TV the internet has had a chance to dine out on in a while, as Barrymore jumps between recreating famous movies she’s made with her buddies, to monologuing, for minutes at a time, about her love of removing stains from T-shirts."

Tracy Moore of Vanity Fair said that it's remarkable that "something so offbeat is happening on daytime at all" of the "low-key insanity" of The Drew Barrymore Show. Moore also said of Barrymore "She cooks; she interior designs; she feels. She talks in hashtags, and casually drops quotes from Gayle King, Patti Smith, and e.e. cummings. She is, it seems, genuinely in awe of everyone and everything, a self-described 'human scrapbook of news,' a 'pop culture junkie,' a lover of people and stain removal."

Jessica Toomer of Uproxx proclaimed that 2020 was the year Drew Barrymore blew up the daytime talk show machine. Toomer added that "Drew Barrymore’s show is all of those things. The kind of mind-numbing social experiment that rivals the frenzied delirium of a Safdie Brothers crime saga but interjects just enough PBS-after-school-special cheer to quiet the shrieking happening inside your brain as you watch. It’s not pretty all the time. Sometimes, it’s not even coherent. But like a 1994-era Chloë Sevigny, it’s the kind of “It Girl” of the talk show universe that you just can’t quite define, but know you should worship anyway."

In September 2022, The New Yorker profiled the show and its host ahead of its third season premiere, expressing bewilderment that the show had been renewed given its ratings and commenting:

“The Drew Barrymore Show” is too chaotic and destabilizing to feel manufactured. The show’s open sentimentality—and copious shed tears—are offset by its crackle of unplanned clumsiness. Bouncing off the walls one moment and breaking down the next, Barrymore seems to be barely holding on as sentiment threatens to overtake her. She is not so much revisiting her past as dragging it along like a bindle full of lessons waiting to be discovered. If her off-the-cuff irrepressibility is an act, then it’s the best performance of her life.

Ratings
In its second week, The Drew Barrymore Show was down 14%, grabbing only 600,000 viewers. Hot Bench, the show that The Drew Barrymore Show replaced in many markets, was steady at 1.7 million. According to an October 15, 2020 report from OK Magazine, the show had already dropped 38% in ratings since it premiered.

According to The Hollywood Reporter, the ratings grew by 19 percent in households and 13 percent among women 25-54 in Nielsen's metered markets between November 2020 and February 2021.

For the 2021–22 season, the program drew an average of 740,000 viewers.

Awards and nominations

References

External links
 
 
 

2020 American television series debuts
2020s American television talk shows
Drew Barrymore
English-language television shows
First-run syndicated television programs in the United States
Television series by CBS Studios
Television shows filmed in New York City
Television series impacted by the COVID-19 pandemic